Supernormal is a Spanish comedy television series created by Olatz Arroyo and Marta Sánchez and directed by Emilio Martínez-Lázaro which stars Miren Ibarguren in the leading role. It was released on Movistar+ on 9 July 2021.

Premises 
The fiction follows Patricia Picón, struggling with her job as investment banking executive and as well as with raising a large family.

Cast 
 Miren Ibarguren as Patricia Picón.
 Diego Martín as Alfonso, Patricia's husband.
 Gracia Olayo as Marisol.
 Bárbara Goenaga as Isa, Patricia's sister.
 Peter Vives as Mauro.
 Usun Yoon as Imelda.
 
  as Juan Carlos.
 Luna Fulgencio as Jimena.
 Nico Rossi as Bosco.
 Pablo Moro as Rico.
 Hugo Alejo as Rodrigo.
 Mauro Muñiz Urquiza as Tito.
 Manu Hernández as Andrés.
  as Gabi, Isa's girlfriend.
Special collaboration

Production and release 
Created and written by Olatz Arroyo and Marta Sánchez, Supernormal was directed by Emilio Martínez-Lázaro. It consists of 6 episodes with an approximate running time of around 25 minutes. Filming began on 17 October 2019 in Madrid. Produced by Movistar+ in collaboration with Secuoya Studios, the series is distributed abroad by Beta Film. On 15 June 2021, Miren Ibarguren disclosed the definitive release date, set for 9 July 2021. The renovation of the series for a second season (directed by Vicente Villanueva) was announced in October 2021.

References

External links 
 

2020s Spanish comedy television series
2021 Spanish television series debuts
Movistar+ network series
Spanish-language television shows
Television shows filmed in Spain